Veritas School, also known simply as Veritas, was a private Christian school in Ridgeland, Mississippi (United States). Located on the Madison/Ridgeland line in the Jackson metro area, The Veritas School was a 6th – 12th grade Christian school. The school's stated mission was to equip the next generation of Christian leaders to think and live biblically. The Veritas School is not affiliated with any individual church or denomination. The Veritas School closed in 2015.

Information
The Veritas School was located at 1202 Highland Colony Parkway in Ridgeland, MS. It was a Christian school that followed a covenantal approach to admissions (at least one parent/guardian must be a professing Christian in order to seek enrollment for a student) and adhered to a classical education method and curriculum. Classical elements included Latin, Logic, Worldview, and Rhetoric classes, and students are encouraged to apply biblical concepts to other subjects across the curriculum. The school also held a non-denominational statement of faith comprising general evangelical tenets. Teachers and staff were required to affirm the statement of faith.

History
Conceived in 1994 and officially established in 1998, Veritas was a non-denominational private Christian school serving the greater Jackson area. The campus was located at the former Colonial Heights Baptist Church building on Old Canton Road in Jackson until 2009, and then in facilities shared with Highland Colony Baptist Church, at 1202 Highland Colony Parkway, Ridgeland MS.

Accreditation and Affiliation
Veritas was accredited by the Mississippi Association of Independent Schools (MAIS), formerly the Mississippi Private School Association. Veritas was also a member school in the Association of Classical and Christian Schools (ACCS), the Southern Association of Independent Schools (SAIS), and the Southern Association of Colleges and Schools (SACS).

Sports
The mascot of Veritas was the Lion. The school colors were green and white.

External links

References

Christian schools in Mississippi
Classical Christian schools
Defunct Christian schools in the United States
Schools in Madison County, Mississippi
Schools in Jackson, Mississippi
Private middle schools in Mississippi
Private elementary schools in Mississippi
Private schools in the Jackson metropolitan area, Mississippi
Educational institutions established in 1998
Educational institutions disestablished in 2015
1998 establishments in Mississippi
2015 disestablishments in Mississippi